Thimphu Football Club was a professional football club from Bhutan, based at the Changlimithang Stadium.

History
The club finished in a  qualifying position during the 2001 season and were then drawn in Group A along with Paro and Drukpol. They managed a win against Paro and then drew with Drukpol to top the group and qualified for the semifinals. Although they lost to Samtse in the semifinals, they beat Drukpol in the third place final to finish third overall.
Thimpu also participated in 2002, although their final position is not known. The only known result involving Thimpu is a 5–1 victory over Drukpol. In 2015, Thimphu became the first Bhutanese club to hire a foreign coach when they hired Fabio Lopez. However, the Italian coach resigned from the club without coaching a single game due to difficulty in adjusting to change in life style from his native Italy. The two foreign players signed under coach Lopez remained in the squad for the 2015 season.

References

Football clubs in Bhutan
Sport in Thimphu
Association football clubs disestablished in 2019